Alliance Hockey is a minor level ice hockey organization based in Southern Ontario.  Founded in 1993, the league is sanctioned by the Ontario Hockey Federation and Hockey Canada.

Member organizations

"AAA"
Brantford 99'ers
Cambridge Hawks
Chatham-Kent Cyclones
Elgin Middlesex Chiefs
Hamilton Huskies
Huron Perth Lakers
Kitchener Jr. Rangers
Lambton Jr. Sting
London Jr. Knights
Sun County Panthers
Waterloo Wolves
Windsor Jr. Spitfires

"AA/A"
Brantford 99'ers
Burlington Bulldogs
Cambridge Hawks
Hamilton Huskies
Kitchener Jr. Rangers
London Jr. Knights Green
London Jr. Knights White
GLHA Jr. Mustangs White
GLHA Jr. Mustangs Purple
Sarnia Jr. Sting
Stratford Warriors
Waterloo Wolves
Woodstock Jr. Navy-Vets

East/Central Development
Brantford Church Saints
Burlington Cougars
Cambridge Hawks
Hamilton Huskies
Kitchener Jr. Rangers
St. Catharines Hurricanes
Waterloo Wolves

West Development
London Bandits Black 
North London Nationals
Oakridge Aeros
Sarnia Jr. Sting
Stratford Warriors
West London Hawks

External links
Alliance Hockey Website

2
Youth ice hockey leagues in Canada